Starksia brasiliensis is a species of labrisomid blenny native to the Atlantic coast of Brazil.  This species can reach a length of  TL.

References

brasiliensis
Fish of Brazil
Endemic fauna of Brazil
Southeastern South American coastal fauna
Fish described in 1900